Michael Francis James (born 30 June 1949) is an American artist, educator, author, and lecturer. He is best known as a leader of the art quilt movement that began in the 1970s. He currently lives and maintains a studio in Lincoln, Nebraska.

Early life and education
James was the first of seven children born to an English and French-Canadian Catholic family in New Bedford, Massachusetts. After high school he enrolled at Southeastern Massachusetts University in neighboring Dartmouth (now the University of Massachusetts at Dartmouth), where he studied painting and printmaking.

After receiving his Bachelor of Fine Arts degree in 1971, he moved to Rochester, New York, to attend graduate school at Rochester Institute of Technology, majoring again in painting and printmaking. While in graduate school he married Judith Dionne, a fellow art student from Southeastern Massachusetts University, and their son, Trevor, was born. Even as he pursued a degree in painting, his interest in the medium began to wane. Before the end of his master's program, he had decided that he had "nothing important to say in painting." Within months of receiving his Master of Fine Arts degree in 1973, he stopped painting altogether, turning his attention to fabric construction.

James had experimented with patchwork and quiltmaking as an undergraduate. His growing enthusiasm for these processes in the early 1970s coincided with a national re-interest in traditional arts spurred by the approaching US Bicentennial celebrations. In the summer of 1971, the Whitney Museum of American Art in New York exhibited selections from the quilt collection of Jonathan Holstein & Gail van der Hoof, a pivotal exhibition that attracted widespread media attraction. James eventually attended a lecture by Holstein and van Der Hoof in 1973 and later said, "The idea that quilts can be art may not have occurred to me had I not seen Amish quilts."

Early career
The growing nationwide interest in quiltmaking created a demand for quilting teachers, and in 1974, James pursued two opportunities to teach adult education classes in nearby communities in Massachusetts—at Bristol Community College in Fall River and at the DeCordova Museum in Lincoln outside of Boston. Through his association with the DeCordova Museum, James met a group of like-minded artists from the Boston area. Other academically-trained artists had also turned to quiltmaking, several of whom participated in the June 1975 DeCordova exhibition, "Bed and Board," the third in a series of shows held in celebration of the Bicentennial and one of the first exhibits of non-traditional quilts in an accredited art museum. James was one of the sixteen quiltmakers included in the show. The experience served as a catalyst for him, and thereafter he aspired to introduce more contemporary design into his own work. 

In the spring of 1977, James published a three-part series of articles in Quilter's Newsletter, called "Color in Quilts", that explored principles covered in his workshops. Shortly afterwards he was approached by Prentice Hall of Englewood, New Jersey, to write a book on quiltmaking. James's The Quiltmaker's Handbook: A Guide to Design and Construction, published in 1978, focused on quiltmaking fundamentals, giving equal treatment to both hand and machine techniques. It also deconstructed the grid system upon which quilt block patterns are based and emphasized the importance of precision.

Artistic development

As interest in quiltmaking took off, so did James's career. He was awarded a Visual Artist's Fellowship by the National Endowment for the Arts in 1978, the first of three that he would receive from the NEA over the next twelve years. In 1979 he served as one of three jurors for the first Quilt National, an exhibition which became a biennial competition showcasing contemporary quiltmaking. By then James was traveling more extensively to teach short, intensive workshops rather than semester-long courses. In that same year, he was the recipient of a Craftsmen's Fellowship from The Artists Foundation of Boston.

Beginning in 1980, James began to create his own striped yardage by sewing strips of cotton and silk together in sets of gradated colors, a development that would drive his work for the next fifteen years. The pieces for his quilt tops were cut from the stripped panels, adding complexity to the repeat block patterns.

James published a sequel to his first instructional book in 1981. The Second Quiltmaker's Handbook: Creative Approaches to Contemporary Quilt Design used exercises from his workshops to explore theories and processes of designing original compositions, and detailed various technical aspects including curved seams and strip-piecing.

Strip-pieced quilts
Many consider strip-piecing to be James's signature technique. His pieced panels eventually grew to encompass 36 strips of fabric, each measuring ¾ to 1 inch wide, and were arranged in "luminous" runs of graded color and value. The quilts themselves could include up to 150 different colors resulting in intricate compositions that required dozens of pattern templates. It was for this work, too, that he earned his reputation as a colorist.

In the early 1980s, James took his workshops overseas, first to England and then, on subsequent trips, to France, Switzerland, Ireland, Italy, and other European countries. His courses emphasized design principles rather than quiltmaking techniques.
Through his teaching he aimed to encourage quilters in their own design work by "demystifying color and pattern."

In a 1985 New York Times article by Patricia Malarcher, Ulysses G. Dietz, at the time the curator of decorative arts for the Newark Museum in New Jersey, announced that the museum had commissioned a piece from James for their permanent collection and described the institution's acquisition policy. "The criterion is quality," he said. "That means not only technical excellence, but also distinctive style." The result was the first in the Rhythm/Color series, Rhythm/Color: Spanish Dance. It was also the first quilt in which James began to deliberately override the block structure. 

As James's work progressed through the mid to late 1980s, the grid-based composition of his designs became increasingly disguised. He strove to eliminate the traditional quilt block construction method from his work completely, as he felt that it was becoming "too predictable." By 1988, his quilts were still designed upon a gridded foundation, but the construction of the quilt tops no longer relied on square blocks. Between 1986 and 1989, he experimented with the overall silhouette of the quilt, breaking out of the standard, rectangular format. His work was described by newspapers and magazine articles of the time as "spacially complex," "airy", and "full of light and movement."

In 1988 he was awarded a second fellowship from the Boston Artist's Foundation and another from the National Endowment for the Arts. His first European exhibit, "Michael James: Nouveaux Quilts," was shown that same year at Galerie Jonas in Petit-Cortaillod, Switzerland, a gallery to which his work would return five times over the next two decades.

By 1990 James was concerned that he had taken the strip-piecing as far as it would go, and he was doubtful that he would continue to make quilts as he felt confined by their limits of geometry. That year, however, he received his third grant from the National Endowment for the Arts, a USA/France Exchange Fellowship. He spent three months, September through November, in an artists' residency in La Napoule, France, where he devoted his time to working with oil pastels and crayons on paper. He credits this brief hiatus from quiltmaking and the resultant drawings with the breakthrough he made after his return to his studio. By 1992, he had found a way to escape the grid structure altogether.

James describes the quilts he made between 1992 and 1995 as a "last hurrah" for the strip-pieced panel technique, and he is best known for the work that he produced during this period. In 1992 James was awarded an honorary Doctor of Fine Arts degree from the University of Massachusetts at Dartmouth, his alma mater, and the following year, he was the 25th person to be inducted into the Quilter's Hall of Fame in Marion, Indiana. His quilt Quilt No. 150: Rehoboth Meander was acquired by the Renwick Gallery of the Smithsonian American Art Museum in Washington, D.C., under the auspices of the James Renwick Alliance, in 1994.

By 1995 he was spending twelve to fourteen weeks a year traveling in Europe and Japan to teach workshops and give lectures. James thought of Switzerland, in particular, as his "second home," as he had taught there every year since 1981. In the summer of 1995, he had a third solo exhibition at Galerie Jonas in Switzerland, which coincided with the release of a retrospective monograph of his work, Michael James: Studio Quilts. The book included documentation of his quilt-building process, as well as photographs of the individual quilts. He was also one of five American artists invited to exhibit in the 8th International Triennial of Tapestry that year in Lodz, Poland, where his piece, The Metaphysics Of Action: Entropic Forms won a juror's citation.

Digital quilts

In the late 1990s, James became increasingly involved with activities at the University of Nebraska in Lincoln. He served on the inaugural advisory board of the International Quilt Study Center & Museum, (now the International Quilt Museum) which was founded at the university in 1997. In 1999 he was offered a full-time position as a senior lecturer in the Department of Textiles, Clothing and Design (now the Department of Textiles, Merchandising and Fashion Design). This opportunity promised a means to integrate art theory and fabric construction in a collegiate textile program. In 2000 he relocated to Lincoln, Nebraska, and began teaching in the fall semester. Over the course of nearly twenty years on that faculty, he taught a range of courses including foundation design, textile design, and quilt studies.

In early 2002, the textile department at the University of Nebraska acquired a Mimaki TX-1600X digital textile printer that could print reactive dyes on fabric up to 60 inches wide. Access to this technology motivated James to take his work in a new direction. He experimented with digital imagery and produced fabric using images from scanned hard copy or from photographs. He modified these images using Adobe Photoshop® and Illustrator®.

James became chairperson of the Department of Textiles, Merchandising and Fashion Design in 2005, a position that he held until his retirement in early 2020. Despite his increased academic responsibilities, he maintained an active studio practice with the help of assistants. In a 2010 article reviewing the exhibition, "Hand Craft: A Decade of Digital Quilts", at Metropolitan Community College near Omaha, Kent Wolgamott, arts columnist for the Lincoln Journal Star, noted that a decade after James had moved to Nebraska, he had created nearly 100 quilts using digitally-developed fabric.

Late career
James’s wife Judith was diagnosed with younger onset Alzheimer’s Disease in 2009. A “movingly poetic” and “gently resigned” body of work emerged from his experiences with the progression of her illness that culminated in a solo exhibition at the International Quilt Museum in Lincoln from June 2015 to February 2016. The exhibition, “Ambiguity & Enigma,” was credited by Wolgamott as being James’s “best, most powerful exhibition this writer has seen either in person or digital reproduction.” James had a similar assessment saying, “I’m very proud of this work. I think it’s the strongest body of work I’ve done to date. There’s a rightness and a kind of perfection in these pieces I’ve not achieved before. If it turns out to be a kind of coda, that’s fine.” Judith died of the complications of the disease in August of 2015. They had been married 43 years.

Shortly after his retirement from the University of Nebraska-Lincoln, James donated the bulk of his papers related to the studio quilt movement to the Archives and Special Collections Department at the University Libraries. He continues to maintain a studio practice in Lincoln, Nebraska, and his work is represented by Modern Arts Midtown in Omaha, Nebraska.

Notes

References

 

 

 
 

 

1949 births
American male writers
Living people
Quilters
University of Nebraska–Lincoln faculty